Food and sexuality have been associated in various ways throughout history. Foods such as chocolate and oysters are said to be aphrodisiacs. In some cultures animal testicles and other items are consumed to increase sexual potency. Food items also provide symbolism, such as the biblical "forbidden fruit" or the cherry with its associations related to virginity. Food items are also used metaphorically in slang sexual terminology and poetry. Some foods are considered sensual for their appearance, texture and taste. Whipped cream, melted chocolate, jam, cake batter, pies, and peanut butter are sometimes used for intimate titillation in an act known as sploshing. The relationship between food and sex has also been explored in books and cinema.

Art and literature

The connection between food and sexuality has been explored in various art works. A 1998 art show, Reflect, an exhibition of works by Monali Meher explored connections and themes including voyeurism, stereotypes, consumerism, freedom and advertising. A display of food and sex related artworks from 19th- and 20th-century American artists was one of 16 concept groupings at a New York Historical Society show in 1991.

In sociology and anthropology
Tasting food, tasting freedom by Sidney Wilfred Mintz includes essays taking "an anthropological view of food, including its relationship to power, freedom, and purity." Food and Sex is also a chapter in Breaking the food seduction by Neal D. Barnard, Joanne Stepaniak. and a topic discussed in Women's conflicts about eating and sexuality by Rosalyn M. Meadow and Lillie Weiss.

Chocolate aphrodisiac controversy
Although some foods do qualify as aphrodisiacs, and chocolate has been thought to be an aphrodisiac for many years, there is some controversy surrounding whether it truly is an aphrodisiac. A study conducted by Salonia et al. (2006)  evaluated the sexual function of women who reported that they ate chocolate daily, and women who reported they did not eat chocolate. The study concluded that once scores were adjusted for age, there were no significant differences in the sexual arousal, satisfaction, desire or distress of those who ate chocolate daily and those who did not. This illustrates that the consumption of chocolate has no effect on sexual function. Likewise, Shamloul (2010) concluded that there is little scientific evidence suggesting that natural aphrodisiacs are an effective method of enhancing sexual desire or performance, nor are they an effective treatment of sexual dysfunction. 
On the contrary, some studies suggest that chocolate is an aphrodisiac and claim that its chemical components such as phenylethylamine, causes an increase in pleasure and sexual drive and N-acylethanolamines, causes an increase in sensitivity and euphoria (Afoakwa, E. 2008). Other studies suggest it is the flavinoids and serotonin found in chocolate that regulate vasoconstriction and dilation and increase female genital functioning, and thus sexual functioning (Shamloul, 2010).
Due to these conflicting views, and the lack of scientific evidence currently available, it is clear that firm conclusions cannot be drawn on whether chocolate is an aphrodisiac.

Examples in media 

The movies Tampopo, 9½ Weeks, Chocolat, Like Water for Chocolate, Eat Drink Man Woman, and Babette's Feast are among those exploring the relationship. The film Tom Jones contains a notable eating scene.

Songs that feature metaphors of food for sex include "Les sucettes" (1966), "Le Banana Split" (1979), "Peaches & Cream" (2001) and "Lollipop" (2008). The cover of the Herb Alpert & the Tijuana Brass 1965 album Whipped Cream and Other Delights famously features a woman covered in whipped cream.

In the movie American Pie a young adult engages in simulated intercourse with a pie. Carl's Junior advertisements have featured a scantily clad Paris Hilton rapturously eating one of the company's burger offerings.

Symbolism

Some foods are symbolic or act as metaphors for body parts involved in sexual relations. Common examples include eggplant, bananas, zucchini and cucumbers as phallic symbols, and peaches as vaginal symbols. Melons have a similar use and are sometimes used as stand-ins for breasts, as in the Austin Powers movie where they are used to cover up an Elizabeth Hurley chest.

See also
 Bread dildo
 Nyotaimori
 Erotica
 Food porn
 Vorarephilia

References

Erotica
Human sexuality
Food and drink culture